The 34th Army Corps was an Army corps in the Imperial Russian Army.

Part of
10th Army: 1915
2nd Army: 1915
1st Army: 1915 - 1916
4th Army: 1916
Russian Special Army: 1916 - 1917
7th Army: 1917

Commanders
January 22-July 2, 1917: Pavlo Skoropadskyi

Reference 

Corps of the Russian Empire